The Mansi languages are spoken by the Mansi people in Russia along the Ob River and its tributaries, in the Khanty–Mansi Autonomous Okrug, and Sverdlovsk Oblast. Traditionally considered a single language, they constitute a branch of the Uralic languages, often considered most closely related to neighbouring Khanty and then to Hungarian. 

The base dialect of the Mansi literary language is the Sosva dialect, a representative of the northern language. The discussion below is based on the standard language. Fixed word order is typical in Mansi. Adverbials and participles play an important role in sentence construction. A written language was first published in 1868, and the current Cyrillic alphabet was devised in 1937.

Varieties

Mansi is subdivided into four main dialect groups which are to a large degree mutually unintelligible, and therefore best considered four languages. A primary split can be set up between the Southern variety and the remainder. A number of features are also shared between the Western and Eastern varieties, while certain later sound changes have diffused between Eastern and Northern (and are also found in some neighboring dialects of Northern Khanty to the east).

Individual dialects are known according to the rivers their speakers live(d) on:

The sub-dialects given above are those which were still spoken in the late 19th and early 20th century and have been documented in linguistic sources on Mansi. Pre-scientific records from the 18th and early 19th centuries exist also of other varieties of Western and Southern Mansi, spoken further west: the Tagil, Tura and Chusovaya dialects of Southern and the Vishera dialect of Western.

The two dialects last mentioned were hence spoken on the western slopes of the Urals, where also several early Russian sources document Mansi settlements. Placename evidence has been used to suggest Mansi presence reaching still much further west in earlier times, though this has been criticized as poorly substantiated.

Northern Mansi has strong Russian, Komi, Nenets, and Northern Khanty influence, and it forms the base of the literary Mansi language.

Western Mansi went extinct ca. 2000. It had strong Russian and Komi influences; dialect differences were also considerable. Long vowels were diphthongized.

Eastern Mansi is spoken by 100–200 people. It has Khanty and Tatar influence. There is vowel harmony, and for  it has , frequently diphthongized.

Southern Mansi was recorded from area isolated from the other Mansi varieties. Around 1900 a couple hundred speakers existed; in the 1960s it was spoken only by a few elderly speakers, and it has since then gone extinct.

Phonology

Consonants

The inventory presented here is a maximal collection of segments found across the Mansi varieties. Some remarks:
 /ɕ/ is an allophone of /sʲ/.
 The voiceless velar fricatives /x/, /xʷ/ are only found in the Northern group and the Lower Konda dialect of the Eastern group, resulting from spirantization of *k, *kʷ adjacent to original back vowels.
 According to Honti, a contrast between *w and *ɣʷ can be reconstructed, but this does not surface in any of the attested varieties.
 The labialization contrast among the velars dates back to Proto-Mansi, but was in several varieties strengthened by labialization of velars adjacent to rounded vowels. In particular, Proto-Mansi *yK → Core Mansi *æKʷ (a form of transphonologization).

Vowels
The vowel systems across Mansi show great variety. As typical across the Uralic languages, many more vowel distinctions were possible in the initial, stressed syllable than in unstressed ones. Up to 18–19 stressed vowel contrasts may be found in the Western and Eastern dialects, while Northern Mansi has a much reduced, largely symmetric system of 8 vowels, though lacking short ** and having a very rare long :

Remarks:
 ы/и /i/ has a velar allophone [ɨ] before г /ɣ/ and after х /x/.
 Long [iː] occurs as a rare and archaic phonetic variant of /eː/, cf. э̄ти ~ ӣти (‘in the evening, evenings’)
 Long /eː/ and /oː/ can be pronounced as diphthongs [e͜͜ɛ] and [o͜͜ɔ].
 у /u/ is found in unstressed (“non-first”) syllables before в /w/, in the infinitive suffix -ункве /uŋkʷe/ and in obscured compound words.
 Reduced /ə/ becomes labialized [ə̹] or [ɞ̯] before bilabial consonants м /m/ and п /p/.

Alphabet

The first publication of the written Mansi language was a translation of the Gospel of Matthew published in London in 1868. In 1932 a version of Latin alphabet was introduced by the Institute of the Peoples of the North with little success. 

The former Latin alphabet:

In 1937, Cyrillic replaced the Latin.

The highlighted letters, and Г with the value , are used only in names and loanwords. The allophones /ɕ/ and /sʲ/ are written with the letter Щ or the digraph СЬ respectively.

Grammar
Mansi is an agglutinating, subject–object–verb (SOV) language.

Article
There are two articles in Mansi: definite ань (aɲ), which also means "now" when placed before verbs, and indefinite акв (akʷ), literally "one". Definiteness (determination) can also be expressed by the third (less often second) person singular possession marker, or in case of direct objects, using transitive conjugation. E.g. а̄мп (’dog’) → а̄мпе (’his/her/its dog’, ’the dog’); ха̄п (’boat’) → ха̄п на̄лув-нарыгтас (’he/she pushed a boat in the water’) ≠ ха̄п на̄лув-нарыгтастэ (’he/she pushed the boat in the water’).

Nouns
There is no grammatical gender. Mansi distinguishes between singular, dual and plural number. Six grammatical cases exist. Possession is expressed using possessive suffixes, for example -ум, which means "my".

Grammatical cases, declining

Missing cases can be expressed using postpositions, such as халнэл (χalnəl, 'of, out of'), саит (sait, 'after, behind'), etc.

Verbs
Mansi conjugation has three persons, three numbers, two tenses, and five moods. Active and passive voices exist.

Intransitive and transitive conjugations are distinguished. This means that there are two possible ways of conjugating a verb. When the speaker conjugates in intransitive, the sentence has no concrete object (in this case, the object is nothing or something like something, anything). In the transitive conjugation, there is a concrete object. This feature also exists in the other Ugric languages.

Personal suffixes 
Personal suffixes are attached after the verbal marker. The suffixes are the following:

Tenses
Mansi uses suffixes to express the tense.

Intransitive present tense 
In intransitive verb conjugations there is no object present. The tense suffix precedes the personal suffix. The form of the present tense suffix depends on the character of the verbal stem, as well as moods. Tense conjugation is formed with the suffixes -эг, -э̄г, -и, -э, -э̄, -г, or -в. In the following examples, the tense suffix is in bold and the personal ending is in italic.

The present tense suffix -э̄г is used if the following personal marker contains a consonant or a highly reduced vowel; the suffix -эг is used if the following personal marker has a stronger vowel, as it is the case in 2nd person dual and plural. 1st person dual has no tense marker but rather a ы between the verb stem and personal ending. 

Verb stems that end in a vowel, have -г as verbal marker. Verb stems that end with the vowel у have -в as verbal marker.

3rd person dual has no personal ending. If the verbal stem ends in a vowel, the tense suffix becomes -ыг. 

1st person plural personal ending is -в if the verbal stems ends in a consonant; the personal ending becomes -ув if the verbal stem ends in a vowel.

Moods

There are four moods: indicative, conditional, subjunctive, imperative and precative.

Indicative mood has no suffix. Imperative mood exists only in the second person.

Active/Passive voice 
Verbs have active and passive voice. Active voice has no suffix; the suffix to express the passive is -ве-.

Verbal prefixes
Verbal prefixes are used to modify the meaning of the verb in both concrete and abstract ways. For example, with the prefix эл- (el-) (away, off)  the verb мина (mina) (go) becomes элмина (elmina), which means to go away. This is surprisingly close to the Hungarian equivalents: el- (away) and menni (to go), where elmenni is to go away

ēl(a) – 'forwards, onwards, away'

χot – 'direction away from something and other nuances of action intensity'

Numbers

Numbers 1 and 2 also have attributive forms: акв (1) and кит (2); compare with Hungarian két, Old Hungarian kit).

Sample vocabulary

Examples

Notes

References
Nyelvrokonaink. Teleki László Alapítvány, Budapest, 2000.
A világ nyelvei. Akadémiai Kiadó, Budapest

 
 
 
 Munkácsi, Bernát and Kálmán, Béla. 1986. Wogulisches Wörterbuch. Akadémiai Kiadó, Budapest. [In German and Hungarian.]
 Riese, Timothy.  Vogul: Languages of the World/Materials 158.  Lincom Europa, 2001. 
 Ромбандеева, Евдокия Ивановна. Мансийский (вогульский) язык, Russian Academy of Sciences, Institute of Linguistics, 1973. [In Russian.]

External links

 Mansi at Omniglot
 Digital version of Munkácsi and Kálmán's dictionary
 Mansi language dictionary
 Mansi basic lexicon at the Global Lexicostatistical Database
 Red Book of the Peoples – Mansi history
 Endangered Languages of Indigenous Peoples of Siberia – Mansi education
 OLAC resources in and about the Mansi language
 Документация и изучение верхнелозьвинского диалекта

Languages of Russia
Uralic languages
Mansi
Khanty-Mansi Autonomous Okrug
Subject–object–verb languages
Agglutinative languages
Vowel-harmony languages
Endangered Uralic languages